Domašov may refer to places in the Czech Republic:

Domašov, a municipality and village in the South Moravian Region
Domašov nad Bystřicí, a municipality and village in the Olomouc Region
Domašov u Šternberka, a municipality and village in the Olomouc Region
Domašov, a village and administrative part of Bělá pod Pradědem in the Olomouc Region